The 2017 Swiss Athletics Championships was the year's national outdoor track and field championships for Switzerland. It was held on 21 and 22 July at the Letzigrund in Zürich. 

It served as the selection meeting for Switzerland at the 2017 World Championships in Athletics.

Results

Men

Women

References

 Schweizer Leichtathletikmeisterschaften Zürich (SM-Aktive) 2017 – Livestream / Startlisten / Zeitplan / Live-Ergebnisse
 2017 Zürich Schweizer Leichtathletik Meisterschaften – Rangliste SM Aktive 21./22. Juli 2017

External links
 Official website 
 Swiss Athletics Federation website 

Swiss Athletics Championships
Swiss Athletics Championships
Swiss Athletics Championships
Swiss Athletics Championships
Sports competitions in Zürich